Franciscus van der Burch (1567–1644) was a bishop of Ghent and archbishop of Cambrai.

Life
Franciscus was born in Ghent on 26 July 1567, the son of Jan van der Burch, a member of the Council of Flanders, and Camille Marguerite Diacetto, a native of Florence. His father would go on to become president of the Great Council of Mechelen in 1584 and of the Privy Council of the Habsburg Netherlands in 1592.

Franciscus was educated partly in Utrecht, where his uncle Lambert van der Burch was dean of the chapter of St. Mary's Church, and partly at the Jesuit college in Douai, before going on to study at Leuven University, where he graduated Licentiate of Laws.

He became a clergyman and was appointed a canon of Arras Cathedral, vicar general of the diocese of Arras, and archdeacon of the archdiocese of Mechelen. He resigned these offices to become a simple canon of the collegiate church in Mons.

In 1612 he accepted nomination as bishop of Ghent, receiving papal confirmation on 1 October 1612 and being consecrated bishop in Ghent Cathedral on 17 February 1613. On 12 May 1616 he was instituted as archbishop of Cambrai, in succession to François Buisseret who had died in 1615. As archbishop he established a number of charitable foundations. The most important of these was the Maison de Sainte-Agnès, or Fondation Vanderburch, established in 1626, which provided vocational education for poor girls between the ages of 12 and 18.

He died in Mons on 23 May 1644. Two streets in Cambrai were named after him.

References

1567 births
1644 deaths
Clergy of the Spanish Netherlands
Old University of Leuven alumni
Bishops of Ghent
Archbishops of Cambrai